Rachèl Louise (born July 8, 1989) is a Dutch-American singer-songwriter. After winning the Utrechtse Popprijs (Utrecht Pop Award) in 2011 and being called Serious Talent at the Dutch pop/rock radio station 3FM, she released her debut album Be Your Own Cheerleader on October 5, 2012.

Biography and career

Louise was born in Utrecht as daughter of Rob and Lee Ann Vermeulen. She already was into music from her youth onwards. While at primary school she already sang in Kids Crew. She also was soloist in the Dutch TV show Prinsen en Prinsessen and she also sang at the black gospel choir Inside Out. She worked at many productions for CD, DVD and TV, both national and international.

In 2011 Louise wins the Utrechtse Popprijs (Utrecht Pop Award), multimedia platform 3VOOR12 calls her the most promising talent from Utrecht and by national radio station 3FM she is called Serious Talent. Since then, she acts in many different radio shows, among them at 538. She is also seen in De Wereld Draait Door. She also plays opening acts for artists like Dotan, James Morrison, Brooke Fraser and Jon Allen.

When Louise achieved her secondary school diploma, she moved to the United States to follow an education at the Musician Institute in Hollywood. After finishing, she returned to the Netherlands to start an education at the music school. She however quit after half a year to become a full-time musician. In 2012 Louise self-publishes her first album Be Your Own Cheerleader.

Discography

Albums

Singles

References

External links 
  

1989 births
21st-century Dutch singers
Dutch people of American descent
Dutch women singer-songwriters
Dutch singer-songwriters
Dutch rock singers
Dutch pop singers
Women rock singers
Living people
Musicians from Utrecht (city)
21st-century Dutch women singers